Richard M. Dumont (born 1959 in Toronto, Ontario) is a Canadian voice actor, writer and director who has worked in both Canada and the United States.

Dumont is known for playing Sardo, who owned a magic shop called Sardo's Magic Mansion, in many episodes of the Canadian-American horror fantasy anthology television series for Nickelodeon, Are You Afraid of the Dark?

Dumont studied at the University of California, Los Angeles, later studying theatre-acting at Ryerson Theatre School before joining The Second City.

Filmography

Voice Work

Animation
The Adventures of Huckleberry Finn - Additional Voices
The Adventures of the Little Koala - Weather, Maki-Maki
Animal Crackers - Additional Voices
The Animal Train - Charlie
Around the World in 80 Dreams - Additional Voices
Arthur - Dr. Hirsch, Al
Beyblade - Crusher, Director, Crowd Member A
Billy and Buddy - Dad
Bob in a Bottle - Mr. Carter
Bobobobs - A.D.
Bumpety Boo - Additional Voices
A Bunch of Munsch - Various
Calimero - Additional Voices
Cat Tales - Additional Voices
Charlie Strap and Froggy Ball Flying High - Froggy Ball
Christopher Columbus - Additional Voices
Cosmic Cowboys - Additional Voices
The Country Mouse and the City Mouse Adventures - Additional Voices
Creepschool - Principal Malcolm
C.L.Y.D.E. - Additional Voices
David Copperfield - Mr. Grimby
Diplodos - Additional Voices
Dragon Hunters - Additional Voices
Edmond Was a Donkey - Edmond's Boss
Favorite Songs/The Real Story of... - Additional Voices
Felix and the Treasure of Morgäa (Félix et le trésor de Morgäa)
Flatmania - Additional Voices
For Better or For Worse - Additional Voices
Fred's Head - Theo Sturgeon
Gawayn - Rex
Gofrette - Hamlet
Gulliver's Travels - Additional Voices
How the Toys Saved Christmas - Skipper, Conductor
Iron Nose: The Mysterious Knight - Iron Nose, Little Bro
Jim Button and Luke the Engine Driver - Additional Voices
Jungle Tales - Additional Voices
The Kids from Room 402 - Mr. Besser
The Legend of the North Wind - Martin
The Legend of White Fang - Additional Voices
The Little Flying Bears - Additional Voices
The Little Lulu Show - Additional Voices
The Lost World - Additional Voices
Lucky Luke - Additional Voices
Madeline - Additional Voices
The Magical Adventures of Quasimodo - Additional Voices
Marsupilami - Additional Voices
Maya the Bee - Willi
Mega Babies - Announcer
Merry Christmas Little Moonky - Weasel
A Miss Mallard Mystery - Additional Voices
Mona the Vampire - Officer Halcroft (2003)
Mrs. Pepper Pot - Additional Voices
The Mysterious Cities of Gold - Menator
My Friend Marsupilami - Marsupilami, David NewmanNight Hood - GrognardPapa Beaver's Storytime - Additional VoicesPatrol 03 - Additional VoicesPinocchio - PunchPirate Family - Victor MaclimpetPrincess Sissi - Additional VoicesPrudence Gumshoe - CrookThe Real Story of Baa Baa Black Sheep - Additional VoicesThe Real Story of O Christmas Tree - Polar BearRipley's Believe It or Not - Additional VoicesRotten Ralph - TV Announcer, Manfred Moon, Bongo Bob, Buddy, MailmanSaban's Adventures of Peter Pan - Additional VoicesSaban's Adventures of Pinocchio - Additional VoicesSaban's Adventures of the Little Mermaid - Prince LotharSagwa, the Chinese Siamese Cat - Additional VoicesSamurai Pizza Cats - Bat Cat, Children, Cannonball BatterySandokan - Additional VoicesSea DogsThe Secret World of Santa Claus - Additional VoicesShaolin Wuzang - TangSharky and George - Additional VoicesSimon in the Land of Chalk Drawings - Additional VoicesThe Smoggies - CoolSnailympics - AnnouncerSpirou - Additional VoicesThree Little Ghosts - Additional VoicesTripping the Rift - Additional VoicesTroll: The Tale of a Tail King Grom, Additional Voices
Tripping the Rift: The Movie - Additional Voices
The True Story of Puss 'n Boots - Puss
Trulli Tales -Copperpot 
Ulysses 31 - Chronos
The What-A-Cartoon! Show - Captain Buzz Cheeply (The Adventures of Captain Buzz Cheeply in A Clean Getaway)
The Wonderful Wizard of Oz - Scarecrow
The World of David the Gnome - King
Wunschpunsch - Additional Voices
Young Robin Hood - Additional Voices

Puppetry
Wimzie's House - Santa Claus, Announcer

Live-Action

TV series
Are You Afraid of the Dark? - Sardo
The Foundation - Narrator

Film
A Dennis The Menace Christmas - Principal Purdy
The Kiss - Abe
Million Dollar Babies - Porcetta
Beethoven's Treasure

Voice Director

Animation
Anpanman
April and the Extraordinary World
The Babaloos
The Bellflower Bunnies
A Bunch of Munsch
Calimero
Cat Tales
Charlie Strap and Froggy Ball Flying High
Chip and Charlie
Cosmic Cowboys
Favorite Songs
Gawayan
Gawain 2
Go Hugo Go
How the Toys Saved Christmas
Hugo The Movie Star
Iron Nose: The Mysterious Knight
Ivanhoe: The King's Knight
The Legend of White Fang
Link
The Little Lulu Show
The Little Twins
Merry Christmas Little Moonky
Milo
Miffy
The Mysteries of Alfred Hedgehog
Night Hood
Papa Beaver's Storytime
Patrol 03
Pirate Family
Potatoes and Dragons
Robinson Sucroe
Rotten Ralph
Sandokan
Shaolin Wuzang
Simba the King Lion
Snailympics
Snowtime!
The True Story of Puss 'n Boots
Winx Club

Puppetry
Anna Banana
The Big Garage
Kitty Cats
Wimzie's House

Live-Action
The Adventures of Grady Greenspace

Video games
Assassin's Creed Rogue - Christopher Gist
Assassin's Creed: Unity
Assassin's Creed: Syndicate
Avatar: The Game
Evolution Worlds
Prince of Persia: Warrior Within - Dahaka
Splinter Cell
Splinter Cell: Blacklist
Splinter Cell: Chaos Theory
Splinter Cell: Pandora Tomorrow
Your Shape

Writer
 Deadly Hope - Lifetime/Incendo Films
 Radio Silence - Lifetime/Incendo Films

Animation
Bob in a Bottle
Calimero
Miffy
Papa Beaver's Storytime
Robinson Sucroe
Three Little Ghosts
Zoe and Charlie

Puppetry
Kitty Cats

References

External links
Official Website

Living people
Canadian male voice actors
Canadian voice directors
Canadian male television actors
Canadian male film actors
Male actors from Toronto
Canadian television writers
Canadian male screenwriters
Canadian male television writers
Writers from Toronto
1958 births
21st-century Canadian screenwriters
21st-century Canadian male writers